Koria is an unincorporated village in the region of Kymenlaakso, Finland. It is under the administration of the town of Kouvola. It is located on Finnish national road 6 6.7 km west of Kouvola and 129 km from Helsinki. Prior to 2009, Koria was part of the town of Elimäki's administrative area, and possessed a population of 5,100 inhabitants. After 2009, Elimäki was consolidated along with 5 other municipalities to form the Town of Kouvola. It is neighbored by the districts of Kankaro, Ruotsula, Keltti, Muhniemi and Myllykoski.

Villages in Finland